The 1963–64 season was the 16th season of competitive football in Israel and the 38th season under the Israeli Football Association, established in 1928, during the British Mandate.

Review and Events
 Israel hosted its first international tournament, the 1964 AFC Asian Cup. The national team won the tournament, its first major trophy.
 The U-19 national team participated for the first time in the AFC U-19 Championship, sharing the cup with Burma after 0–0 in the final.
 Prior to the U-19 national team's departure to the AFC Youth Championship, several players were questioned by the Military Police on suspicions of falsifying their I.D. cards, in an attempt of making three of the team's squad, Ze'ev Seltzer, Moshe Leon and Danny Borsok, eligible for the competition, as the three were born before the cut-off date of 1 April 1944. The three were released and departed with the team to Saigon, where they were declared ineligible to the competition and didn't take part in it, while the investigation was handed over the civil police. Upon the team's return from the championship, the three were arrested by the police, along with Shmuel Ben-Dror, head of the Israeli delegation to the championship. In July 1964, Seltzer, Borsok and Ben-Dror, along with another IFA executive, Uri Vilenski, were charged with document falsification and knowingly transferring falsified documents. The trial was concluded in February 1965, and Seltzer, Borsok and Vilenski were found guilty, while Ben-Dror was cleared of all charges.
 At the end of the season, the IFA decided to set the number of team in each division to 16 (except for Liga Gimel, in which the number of club in each division was set by the number of clubs registering for the season). This meant that Liga Leumit was expanded from 15 clubs to 16 and both Liga Alef division were expanded from 14 clubs to 16 clubs.

Domestic leagues

Promotion and relegation
The following promotions and relegations took place at the end of the season:

Promoted to Liga Leumit
 Maccabi Netanya
 Beitar Tel Aviv

Relegated from Liga Leumit
 Hapoel Lod

Promoted to Liga Alef
 Hapoel Safed
 Beitar Haifa
 Hapoel Bnei Nazareth
 Hapoel Netanya
 Hapoel Ra'anana
 Beitar Lod
 Beitar Harari Tel Aviv
 Hapoel Ashkelon
 Maccabi Holon

Relegated from Liga Alef
 Hapoel Nahariya
 Hapoel Givat Haim
 Maccabi Shmuel Tel Aviv
 Hapoel Rishon LeZion

Promoted to Liga Bet
 Hapoel Hulata
 Hapoel Beit Eliezer
 Beitar Beit Lid
 Hapoel Shefayim
 Beitar Petah Tikva
 Beitar Ramat Gan
 Beitar Rehovot
 ASA Jerusalem
 Hapoel Kiryat Malakhi
 Hapoel Be'eri
 Hapoel Yagur
 Beitar Kiryat Tiv'on
 Hapoel Ashdod

Relegated from Liga Bet
 Beitar Acre
 Beitar Safed
 Beitar Binyamina
 Beitar Mahane Yehuda
 Beitar Holon
 Hapoel HaTzafon Jerusalem
 Maccabi Ashkelon
 Maccabi Ramla

Domestic cups

Israel State Cup
The 1963–64 Israel State Cup, which stated on 21 September 1963, was delayed by a series of appeals on third round results which were settled only by June 1963, forcing the competition to be carried over to the next season.

National Teams

National team

1964 Summer Olympics qualification
The national team competed in the Asian zone of the 1964 Summer Olympics qualification and was drawn to play South Vietnam in the first round. After winning 1–0  in Saigon, Israel suffered a shock 0–2 defeat in Ramat Gan and was eliminated from qualification.

1964 AFC Asian Cup

1963–64 matches

National U-19 team

1964 AFC Youth Championship

First round

Final

References